Arjunnagar is a village in the Karmala taluka of Solapur district in Maharashtra state, India.

Demographics
Covering  and comprising 286 households at the time of the 2011 census of India, Arjunnagar had a population of 1371. There were 692 males and 679 females, with 191 people being aged six or younger.

References

Villages in Karmala taluka